HMS Zest was a Z-class destroyer of the Royal Navy that saw service during World War II.

Post war service

Between September and November 1945 Zest was refitted at Leith.  Between August 1946 and February 1947 she was part of the 4th Destroyer Flotilla, as part of the Home Fleet. From July 1947 until February 1948 she was used for Torpoedo training at Portsmouth.

From September 1952 until February 1954 she was in reserve at Chatham Dockyard. Between 1954 and 1956 she was converted into a Type 15 fast anti-submarine frigate at Chatham Dockyard.  She was also allocated the new pennant number F102, changing from its initial R02. She was the only Z-class destroyer to be converted into a Type 15 frigate.

Between 1956 and 1958 she was leader of the 3rd Training Squadron. From 1958 until 1961 she was part of the 4th Frigate Squadron, and in 1961 she had a refit at Malta. In 1964 she joined the Far East Fleet, joining the 24th Escort Squadron. She carried out patrols in the Singapore and Malacca Straits to prevent infiltration of Indonesian-led forces and smuggling of weapons during the Indonesia–Malaysia confrontation. In November 1964, the merchant ship  ran aground on the Bombay Shoal in the South China Sea, as did the tug  when she tried to assist. Zest rescued the crews from both ships, 45 people in total, before a typhoon struck the stranded ships. Zest returned to British waters at the end of 1965, paying off at Plymouth of 15 December that year before recommissioning with a new crew. In 1967, while in the West Indies, Zest was deployed at St Vincent during local election period as a precaution. From July 1967 to July 1968 Zest was deployed to the Far East Station visiting Cape Town, Mombasa, Gan, Sydney, Dunedin, New Plymouth, Yokohama, Hong Kong and Singapore

Decommissioning and disposal
In July 1968 she paid off into Reserve at Plymouth. In 1969 she was placed on the Disposal List and sold to BISCO for demolition by Arnott Young at Dalmuir on the Clyde. Whilst on tow by the tug Bustler the ship broke away from tow. After re-connection she arrived at the breakers on 18 July 1970.

Notes

References
 
 
 
 

 

W and Z-class destroyers
1943 ships
World War II destroyers of the United Kingdom
Cold War destroyers of the United Kingdom
Type 15 frigates of the Royal Navy
Cold War frigates of the United Kingdom
Ships built by John I. Thornycroft & Company